Zontia is a genus of mites in the family Laelapidae.

Species
 Zontia meliponensis Türk, 1948

References

Laelapidae